Lijia Township is a township in Ledu District, Haidong, Qinghai, China. , it administers the following 17 villages:
Lannigou Village
Gangouling Village
Dawa Village
Majuan Village
Minzu Village
He'erhong Village
Gongcagou Village
Ataling Village
Ximaying Village
Dongmaying Village
Danke'er Village
Chenjiamo Village
Gaquanwan Village
He'erci Village
Jiaojiewan Village
Shanzhuang Village
Shuangping Village

References 

Township-level divisions of Qinghai
Haidong